The Zone Program Integrity Contractor (ZPIC) is an entity established in the United States by the Centers for Medicare & Medicaid Services (CMS) to combat fraud, waste and abuse in the Medicare program. As a result of the Medicare Prescription Drug, Improvement, and Modernization Act of 2003, which established seven zones throughout the United States for the purpose of processing Medicare claims, CMS created ZPICs to more effectively protect the Medicare program. ZPICs replaced Program Safeguard Contractors (PSC), which had been established by the Health Insurance Portability and Accountability Act of 1996.

References 

Medicare and Medicaid (United States)